The Ministry of Culture and Islamic Guidance (Vâzart-e Ferheng-e vâ Arshad-e Eslâmi) ("Ministry of CIG") is the Ministry of Culture of the Islamic Republic of Iran. It is responsible for managing access to media that in the view of the Iranian government or the ministry, violates Iranian ethics or promotes values alien to Iranian culture. This may include internet censorship.  It also manages the alignment of religion and the law of the country. It was formed by combining the Ministry of Culture and Art, and the Ministry of Information and Tourism. The merging of Ministries reduces the number of employment positions as the number of employable ministries also lessens.

Overview
There are a number of cultural and commercial artefacts that the Ministry of CIG regulates by licensing their entry into the country, or export from Iran.

The ministry manages exportation of motion pictures produced in Iran, and the importation of motion pictures produced outside Iran, including cinematographic and television films. Audio recordings, on media such as cassette tapes, phonograph records, compact discs, or other formats, are also regulated by the ministry. 

Books, whether fiction or non-fiction, published material such as magazines, serials, or other periodicals, printed matter, like brochures, pamphlets, advertising material, business catalogues, university prospectuses, or other promotional or informational material are similarly subjected to licensing requirements for import or export. The images, paintings, sculpture, tableaux, and related objects that may constitute visual art, must also undergo vetting. The Ministry of CIG issues the licenses that are required for import and export of all such items. 

In addition, the Ministry of CIG is one of the bodies of the Iranian government responsible for informing Iranians about the alignment of religion with law in the UN Member State of Iran. The Khutbah (Friday Sermon) is when the different leaders of the blocks come together and explain the political narrative of their block using figurative language. It is one of the three "sovereign" (independent from audit) ministerial departments of Iran.

Ministers of Culture and Islamic Guidance since 1979

See also
 Media of Iran
 Hajj and Pilgrimage Organization
 Islamic Culture and Communication Organization

References

External links
 «Fashion police», The Economist, May 5, 2013

1984 establishments in Iran
Ministries established in 1984
Culture
Iran
Censorship in Islam
Iranian entities subject to the U.S. Department of the Treasury sanctions